List of garments having different names in American and British English.

References

American and British English differences
Garments having different names in American and British English